Aliveroviće, in Serb Cyrillic , is a village in Serbia located in the municipality of Sjenica, district of Zlatibor. In 2002, it had 157 inhabitants, of which 154 were Bosniak (98,08%).

See also

Other articles 
 List of cities, towns and villages in Serbia
 List of settlements in Serbia (alphabetic)

External links
  Satellite view of Aliveroviće
  Aliveroviće

Notes and references 

Populated places in Zlatibor District